La vendetta di Lady Morgan is a 1965 Italian horror film directed by Massimo Pupillo and written by Gianni Grimaldi.

Cast
Gordon Mitchell as Roger
Erika Blanc  as Lillian
Barbara Nelli as Lady Susan Morgan
Paul Muller as Sir Harold Morgan 
Michel Forain as Pierre Brissac
Carlo Kechler as Sir Neville Blackhouse

Release
La vendetta di Lady Morgan was distributed in Italy by I.N.D.I.E.F. when it was released on December 16, 1965. It grossed a total of 61 million Italian lire. Unlike Pupillo's other horror films, La vendetta di Lady Morgan only received a theatrical release domestically in West Germany in 1967.

The film was the last horror film Pupillo directed due to his lack of interest in making any more films in the genre; he turned down propositions to make other horror films. Pupillo spoke on the topic, explaining that "I started in the horror genre because I wanted to get out of documentaries, I wanted to enter the commercial market. In Italy, when you do a certain type of film, you become labelled and you can't do anything else. I remember one day, a producer called me to do a film only because the other producers told him he had to get either Mario Bava or me. When I understood this, I felt dead."

Reception
From retrospective reviews, Roberto Curti, author of Italian Gothic Horror Films, 1957-1969 stated that the film was "by no means the best, but perhaps most peculiar" of the three horror films Pupillo directed. Louis Paul noted in his book Italian Horror Film Directors, that the film was made in a "more careful and studied manner that any of Pupillo's other films as a director" and that the film was "a successful attempt at emulating the better Gothic horror films of earlier years, but by 1966, audiences were tuned into and expecting more from the colorful and violence-soaked horror films other filmmakers were churning out."

See also
List of horror films of 1965
List of Italian films of 1965

References

Footnotes

Sources

External links
 

1965 films
1965 horror films
Films scored by Piero Umiliani
Italian horror films
1960s Italian-language films
Gothic horror films
1960s Italian films